The Thomas Hunt House was a historic house in rural White County, Arkansas.  It was located north of Plainview, on the east side of Arkansas Highway 157, just south of County Road 704.  It was a single-story wood frame double-pen structure, with a gabled roof and a projecting front gable with a wraparound porch supported by chamfered posts.   Built about 1885, it was a rare surviving example of the double-pen frame form, prior to its destruction by fire in 2015.

The house was listed on the National Register of Historic Places in 1992.

See also
National Register of Historic Places listings in White County, Arkansas

References

Houses on the National Register of Historic Places in Arkansas
Houses completed in 1885
Houses in White County, Arkansas
National Register of Historic Places in White County, Arkansas